Xu Qing (born 11 March 1987) is a Chinese footballer who plays as a  right-back.

Club career
Xu Qing started his football career in the 2005 league season playing for Wuhan Optics Valley where he made eight appearances in his debut season. He would be a squad player for Wuhan until they were controversially relegated then subsequently disbanded during the 2008 season after the club's management did not accept the punishment given to them by the Chinese Football Association after a scuffle broke out during a match against Beijing Guoan on 27 September 2008.

He would join another top tier club in Chengdu Blades, however he struggled to gain any playing time and was loaned out to their satellite team Sheffield United (Hong Kong) and then Shaanxi Baorong Chanba. His time at Shaanxi would become permanent on 4 January 2010. After three seasons in the top tier with Shaanxi where he struggled to establish himself as a vital member of their team he joined second tier club Chongqing on 24 February 2012 to revive his career. At Chongqing he would establish himself as a vital member of their team until the club were relegated at the end of 2013 China League One season and he was free to leave the club.

Xu Qing joined another second tier club in Xinjiang Tianshan Leopard where for the next five season as he became a vital member of their team until he joined Inner Mongolia Zhongyou. In the 2021 China League One campaign he joined Wuhan Three Towns and in his first season with the club he would go on to aid them in winning the division title and promotion into the top tier for the first tine in their history.

Career statistics
.

Notes

Honours

Club
Wuhan Three Towns
China League One: 2021

References

External links

1987 births
Living people
Footballers from Wuhan
Footballers from Hubei
Chinese footballers
Association football defenders
Chinese Super League players
Hong Kong Premier League players
China League One players
Wuhan Optics Valley F.C. players
Chengdu Tiancheng F.C. players
Chongqing F.C. players
Xinjiang Tianshan Leopard F.C. players
Inner Mongolia Zhongyou F.C. players
Wuhan Three Towns F.C. players
Chinese expatriate footballers
Chinese expatriate sportspeople in Hong Kong
Expatriate footballers in Hong Kong